The Iraqi Telecommunication and Post Company (ITPC) is a government-owned and operated corporation responsible for providing telecommunication and mail services in Iraq.

See also
 List of postal codes in Iraq
 Postage stamps and postal history of Iraq

References 

 https://web.archive.org/web/20091014092021/http://www.cpa-iraq.org/pressreleases/20040524_postal.html 
 https://web.archive.org/web/20090305035846/http://www.iraqimoc.net/e_aboutus1.htm

External links
 http://www.itpc.gov.iq

Postal organizations
Government-owned companies of Iraq
Telecommunications companies of Iraq
Postal system of Iraq
Iraqi brands
Government-owned telecommunications companies
Companies based in Baghdad